Linda Louise Duan (born 13 December 1993) is a British actress.

Early life and education
After A-levels, Linda became interested in performing after taking a mime course with Desmond Jones: "Desmond was the man who got me to reconsider my options of pursuing something outside of a standard degree... He later went on and told me about other specialist schools that I would not have known much about... I thought about it carefully and decided to talk to my Dad about this possibility....with his blessing, I went down that road!" After graduating, Duan began to audition for more roles.

Career
Duan was in Israel when she was contacted by assistant director Holly Gardner to audition for a secret project. When she learned that it involved Marvel Studios, she immediately flew back to London to audition. She eventually learned that it was Doctor Strange and began to research her character Tina Minoru. Duan found the role invigorating despite the character's limited appearance, but hopes that it would open doors for other actresses: "I want to be a good role model for Chinese girls growing up. When I was growing up I had Barbie dolls with blonde hair and blue eyes and that’s what my perception of beauty was because that’s what I was exposed to...I want to see more characters like Mulan."

Personal life
Duan practices karate in her spare time.

Filmography

References

External links

Living people
1993 births
English actresses
21st-century English actresses
British actresses of Chinese descent
English film actresses
English people of Chinese descent
People from Chester